Ephraim Banda (born November 1, 1981) is an American football coach who is the safeties coach for the Cleveland Browns of the National Football League (NFL).

Playing career 
Banda played safety at Incarnate Word from 2008 to 2010, where he joined the newly created football program as a 25-year old walk-on and was named the special teams captain in the program's first career game. He was considered to be one of the oldest players in college football at that time, and was also older than his position coach.

Coaching career 
After suffering a knee injury that ended his playing career, Banda stayed with the Cardinals football program as a student assistant while he completed his degree. He was named a graduate assistant at Texas in 2012 behind the recommendation of a former Incarnate Word coach who was hired at Texas. While at Texas, he developed a close relationship with Longhorns defensive coordinator Manny Diaz, as they both got their first jobs outside of coaching. He stayed with the program as they transitioned from Mack Brown to Charlie Strong before joining Diaz at Mississippi State as a defensive quality control coach.

Miami (FL) 
Banda followed Diaz to Miami, where he was named the safeties coach in 2016. After Diaz left briefly to accept the head coaching position at Temple, Banda was promoted to co-defensive coordinator.

Utah State 
Banda was named the defensive coordinator and safeties coach at Utah State on January 5, 2021.

Cleveland Browns 
On February 21, 2023, Banda was hired to be the Cleveland Browns safeties coach under DC Jim Schwartz.

Personal life 
Banda and his wife Crystal have two children; Darian and Aamani. Before playing at Incarnate Word, Banda was a bartender on the San Antonio River Walk and continued to work as one during his playing career in order to pay bills.

References

External links 
 
 Utah State Aggies profile

1981 births
Living people
Sportspeople from San Antonio
Players of American football from San Antonio
Coaches of American football from Texas
American football safeties
Incarnate Word Cardinals football players
Incarnate Word Cardinals football coaches
Texas Longhorns football coaches
Mississippi State Bulldogs football coaches
Miami Hurricanes football coaches
Utah State Aggies football coaches
Cleveland Browns coaches
American sportspeople of Mexican descent